The Albert Tower on the Isle of Man is a historic monument which is one of Isle of Man's Registered Buildings. It was registered on 27 January 2003 as number 214.

It was used as a lookout in World War II and has been closed since.

History

The Tower Bends, an S-curve feature of the Snaefell Mountain Course is nearby and named for it.

It is a location visited by Albert, Prince Consort on 20 September 1847. Queen Victoria, his wife, stayed on their ship offshore. In 1848 the monument/tower was built, the foundation stone being laid by Mrs Eden who was the wife of Robert Eden, 3rd Baron Auckland the Bishop of Sodor and Man. It was designed by George W. Buck and cost £300 to build.

During World War II it was used as a lookout tower by the Home Guard. After the war access to the tower was stopped because of the poor state of the staircase within the tower.

In 2005 a two pence coin was minted for the Isle of Man with an image of the tower on it.

Architecture

It bears an inscription saying "Erected on the spot where HRH. Prince Albert stood to view Ramsey and its neighbourhood during the visit of Hen Most Gracious Majesty Queen Victoria to Ramsey Bay, the 20th of September, 1847."

References

Towers in the Isle of Man
Registered Buildings of the Isle of Man